Bani Gala is a residential area located in Islamabad at the eastern bank of Rawal Lake.

History 

The residential area of Bani Gala has remained controversial Since its establishment in early 2000, as reportedly some localities were constructed on private land without permission. Moreover, Rawal Lake was being polluted because of construction activity in the nearby areas, commercial fishing, and sewage discharge of Bani Gala and other nearby villages into it.

Capital Development Authority vowed to take action against all unauthorised constructions beside Rawal Lake with a view to control pollution in the water reservoir.

The locality became famous after the former head of the country's nuclear programme, Dr Abdul Qadeer Khan built his house there and since then the issue of "illegality" of the locality had been sidelined.

Currently the Bani Gala Mansion, located in residential area, is the official residence of former cricketer and Chairman of Pakistan Tehreek-e-Insaf and the former Prime Minister of Pakistan Imran Khan.

Development 

  Lakhwal Village - that falls on this road - has some residential houses but they have been constructed illegally
  15 minutes drive from Bani Gala is the main campus of COMSATS, the educational institution and University,
 Kinara restaurant is a recent development at Bani Gala which has turned into a beautiful hangout spot at Rawal Lake.
 Rawal Lake View Park has been planted with flowering trees and laid out with gardens, picnic spots, and secluded paths.  The terraced garden and the lake are used for picnics, fishing and boating. The highest point in the garden offers a panoramic view of the lake, Margalla and Murree hills, Rawalpindi and Islamabad.

  The Korang Tributary is inviting for birds during their usual migrating patterns to/from North and South of Pakistan. This Siberian Bird Migration has several stops around Islamabad on the way to the hotter south.
 Pakistan Poverty Alleviation Fund (PPAF) is located in front of Capital Complex society in Bani Gala, Islamabad, and is spread over 4.5 acres and one of the largest non-governmental organisations working in the field of poverty eradication.
 Atif Aslam performed a live musical concert at Beaconhouse Mohranur Campus located in Bani Gala, Islamabad on 10 August 2010
 Upper Bani Gala area lies on South-Eastern edge of Bani Gala and comprises Upper Bani Gala Road and Noor Avenue. It's primarily a residential area situated on a hillock which lies at an elevation between 1800~2000 feet ASL.

Illegal occupation 

 A three members bench of the apex court, headed by Chief Justice of Pakistan Iftikhar Muhammad Chaudhry took suo moto notice over the letter, written by Pakistan Tehreek-e-Insaf Chairman Imran Khan against the illegal occupation of state land by Leader of the House in Senate Nayyar Bukhari and his relatives.

In response to Imran Khan's complaint the authority wrote to Khan that his own property, Bani Gala had been built without planning permission. Therefore, Bani Gala is an illegal structure. Justice (r) Saqib Nisar asked Khan/authority to REGULARISE Bani Gala. It is now regularised.

References

External links
Bani Gala's grabbed land retrieved, SC told
Take Bani Gala land back from Bukhari, SC tells CDA

Islamabad